The 2021 Ferris State Bulldogs football team represented Ferris State University as a member of the Great Lakes Intercollegiate Athletic Conference (GLIAC) during the 2021 NCAA Division II football season. They were led by tenth-year head coach Tony Annese. The Bulldogs played their home games at Top Taggart Field in Big Rapids, Michigan.

The Bulldogs competed for the 2021 NCAA Division II Football Championship Game against Valdosta State. This was their first appearance in the championship game since the 2018 game. Ferris State defeated Valdosta State, 58–17. The win gave Ferris State their football program's first national championship.

Schedule

Rankings

References

Ferris State
Ferris State Bulldogs football seasons
NCAA Division II Football Champions
Great Lakes Intercollegiate Athletic Conference football champion seasons
College football undefeated seasons
Ferris State Bulldogs football